The 2020–21 Associate international cricket season was from September 2020 to April 2021. All official twenty over matches between Associate members of the ICC were eligible to have full Twenty20 International (T20I) or Women's Twenty20 International (WT20I) status, as the International Cricket Council (ICC) granted T20I status to matches between all of its members from 1 July 2018 (women's teams) and 1 January 2019 (men's teams). The season included all T20I/WT20I cricket series mostly involving ICC Associate members, that were played in addition to series covered in International cricket in 2020–21.

Season overview

September

2020 Central Europe Cup

The 2020 Central Europe Cup was cancelled due to the COVID-19 pandemic.

Malta in Bulgaria

October

Bulgaria in Romania

December

2020 South American Cricket Championship
The 2020 South American Championships were cancelled due to the COVID-19 pandemic.

January

Zimbabwe women in Namibia

The series was postponed in January 2021 due to the COVID-19 pandemic.

February

Nepal in Qatar
The series was postponed in February 2021 due to the COVID-19 pandemic.

April

Uganda in Namibia

2020–21 Nepal Tri-Nation Series

Malta in Belgium
The series was postponed in April 2021 due to the COVID-19 pandemic.

Romania in Belgium
The series was postponed in April 2021 due to the COVID-19 pandemic.

See also
 International cricket in 2020–21
 Impact of the COVID-19 pandemic on cricket

Notes

References

2020 in cricket
2021 in cricket